Anti anti-communism is opposition to anti-communism as applied in the Cold War. The term was first coined by Clifford Geertz, an American anthropologist at the Institute for Advanced Study, who defined it as being applied in "the cold war days" by "those who ... regarded the [Red] Menace as the primary fact of contemporary political life" to "[t]hose of us who strenuously opposed [that] obsession, as we saw it ... with the insinuation – wildly incorrect in the vast majority of cases – that, by the law of the double negative, we had some secret affection for the Soviet Union." Stated more simply by Kristen Ghodsee and Scott Sehon, "the anthropologist Clifford Geertz wrote that you could be 'anti anti-communism' without being in favour of communism."

Analysis 
Some academics and journalists argue that anti-communist narratives have exaggerated the extent of political repression and censorship in states under communist rule or have drawn comparisons with what they see as atrocities that were perpetrated by capitalist countries, particularly during the Cold War. Among them are Mark Aarons, Vincent Bevins, Noam Chomsky, Jodi Dean, Kristen Ghodsee, Seumas Milne, and Michael Parenti. Academic Albert Szymanski drew a comparison between the treatment of anti-communist dissidents in the Soviet Union after Joseph Stalin's death and the treatment of dissidents in the United States during the period of McCarthyism, claiming that "on the whole, it appears that the level of repression in the Soviet Union in the 1955 to 1980 period was at approximately the same level as in the United States during the McCarthy years (1947–1956)."

In 1964, socialist historian Theodore Draper used the term "anti-anti-communism" to refer to Fidel Castro's consolidation of power in 1959, which preceded the Cuban-Soviet economic agreement of 1960.

John Earl Haynes, who studied the Venona decryptions extensively, argued that Joseph McCarthy's attempts to "make anti-communism a partisan weapon" actually "threatened [the post-War] anti-Communist consensus", thereby ultimately harming anti-communist efforts more than helping them. President Harry Truman called Joseph McCarthy "the greatest asset the Kremlin has." Liberal anti-communists like Edward Shils and Daniel Moynihan had a contempt for McCarthyism. Sociologist Edward Shils criticized an excessive policy of secrecy during the Cold War, leading to the misdirection of McCarthyism, which was addressed during the 1994-1997 Moynihan Commission. As Moynihan put it, "reaction to McCarthy took the form of a modish anti-anti-Communism that considered impolite any discussion of the very real threat Communism posed to Western values and security." After revelations of Soviet spy networks from the declassified Venona project, Moynihan wondered: "Might less secrecy have prevented the liberal overreaction to McCarthyism as well as McCarthyism itself?" In 1998, Geoffrey Wheatcroft criticised certain aspects of anti-anti-communism. He suggested that "one mark of the true anti-anti-communist is an evasive use of language" such as downplaying historical Soviet espionage.

Linguist Noam Chomsky noted double standards in his criticism of The Black Book of Communism. In outlining economist Amartya Sen's research on hunger that while India's democratic institutions prevented famines, its excess of mortality over Communist China, potentially attributable to the latter's more equal distribution of medical and other resources, was nonetheless close to four million per year for non-famine years. Chomsky argued that if the same methodology of The Black Book of Communism was applied to India, then "the democratic capitalist 'experiment' has caused more deaths than in the entire history of ... Communism everywhere since 1917: over 100 million deaths by 1979, and tens of millions more since, in India alone." At a April 2017 conference at the University of Bern called "Anti-communist persecutions in the 20th Century," American historian Ronald Grigor Suny suggested that the panel write "The Black Book of Anti-communism," referencing the controversial The Black Book of Communism.

In her 2012 book The Communist Horizon, political philosopher Jodi Dean argued that there is a double standard among all sides of the political spectrum, including conservatives, liberals, and social democrats, in how communism and capitalism are perceived nearly two decades after the dissolution of the Soviet Union. Dean stated that the worst excesses of capitalism are often minimized, while communism is often equated only with the Soviet Union, and experiments in Eastern Europe, Latin America, Africa, and Asia are often ignored, with an emphasis placed on the Stalin era and its violent excesses including gulags, purges, droughts and famines, and almost no consideration for the industrialization and modernization of the Soviet economy, the successes of Soviet science (such as the Soviet space program), or the rise in the standard of living for the once predominantly agrarian society. The dissolution of the Soviet Union is therefore seen as the proof that communism can not work, allowing for all left-wing criticism of the excesses of neoliberalism capitalism to be silenced, for the alternatives would supposedly inevitably result in economic inefficiency and violent authoritarianism.

Other academics and journalists such as Kristen Ghodsee and Seumas Milne asserted that in the post–Cold War era any narratives which include Communist states' achievements are often ignored, while those which focus exclusively on the crimes of Joseph Stalin and other Communist party leaders are amplified. Both allege this is done in part to silence any criticism of global capitalism. Political scientist Michael Parenti holds that Communist regimes, as flawed as they were, nevertheless played a role in "tempering the worst impulses of Western capitalism and imperialism", and criticized left-wing anti-communists in particular for failing to understand that in the post–Cold War era Western business interests are "no longer restrained by a competing system" and are now "rolling back the many gains that working people in the West have won over the years." Parenti added that "some of them still don't get it." Vincent Bevins argues that anti-communist mass killings backed by the United States during the Cold War have been far more impactful on shaping the contemporary world than communist mass killings have.

In a critique of Stephen F. Cohen, Jonathan Chait used a fully hyphenated form of the term in 2014, calling Cohen "an old-school leftist who has carried on the mental habits of decades of anti-anti-communism seamlessly into a new career of anti-anti-Putinism", referring to the use of whataboutism or what Chait calls "defense-by-implication" as a rhetorical strategy by RT commentators.

See also 
 McCarthyism

References 

Anti-communism
Cold War terminology
Communism in the United States
1940s in the United States
1950s in the United States
McCarthyism
Political and cultural purges